William Henry Pommer (1851–1937) was an American composer, known for his songs and chamber music.  From 1907 he was director of music at the University of Missouri becoming the founding dean of the University of Missouri School of Music. The Pommer family were German immigrants who manufactured musical instruments, first in Philadelphia then in Hermann, Missouri.

Christian College
Prior to his appointment at the University of Missouri Pommer was director of music at Christian College also in Columbia. Today, Christian College is known as Columbia College

References

External links
 

1851 births
1937 deaths
Musicians from Columbia, Missouri
Composers from Columbia, Missouri
American male composers
American composers
University of Missouri faculty
University of Missouri School of Music faculty
Columbia College (Missouri) faculty
German-American culture in Missouri